Lascari (Sicilian: Làschiri) is a comune (municipality) in the Metropolitan City of Palermo in the Italian region Sicily, located about  east of Palermo.

Lascari borders the following municipalities: Campofelice di Roccella, Cefalù, Collesano, Gratteri.

Demographic evolution

History
Lascari is not a very old village. In 1693 a group of peasants moved from Gratteri in the mountains, to a zone near the sea. They began to build houses around an existing bell tower. Baron Gaetano Ventimiglia gave the new hamlet the name of Lascari, in honor of his descent from the strain of Lascari's emperors of Constantinople. In 1840 Lascari became independent from Gratteri and in 1890 the right to a territory was granted but only in 1924 the town obtained it. During these last years a lot of detached or semi-detached houses have been built near the beaches, so in the summer a lot of holiday-makers come here from Palermo or other towns in the centre of Sicily. The town hall is in "Aldo Moro" square.

References

External links
 Official Website of Comune di Lascari

Municipalities of the Metropolitan City of Palermo
1693 establishments in Italy